Joseph Ouellette may refer to:
 Joseph R. Ouellette, United States Army soldier and Medal of Honor recipient
 Joseph E. M. Ouellette, member of the Legislative Assembly of New Brunswick